The Liberation Tour may refer to:

 The Liberation Tour (Christina Aguilera tour)
 The Liberation Tour (Mary J. Blige and D'Angelo tour)